Wei, commonly spelled Wey to distinguish from the contemporary larger Wei state, was an ancient Chinese state that was founded in the early Western Zhou dynasty and rose to prominence during the Spring and Autumn period.  Its rulers were of the surname Ji, the same as that of the rulers of Zhou. It was located in modern northeastern Henan Province, east of Jin (and later Wei ), and west of Cao.

Early history
The history of Wey dates back to the beginning of the Zhou Dynasty and the Rebellion of the Three Guards. After the Duke of Zhou successfully defeated the rebellion, Kang Shu, a younger brother of King Wu of Zhou was given a fief centred on Zhaoge, the capital of the Shang Dynasty, which had been the centre of the rebellion.

Spring and Autumn Period
The State of Wey was at its peak during the early Spring and Autumn Period, under Duke Wu of Wey, who reigned for 55 years. In the reign of subsequent rulers, however, the state was plagued by succession troubles, until Duke Yi of Wey took the throne; his dissolute rule and obsession with cranes weakened the state, and in the eighth year of his reign the Rong peoples successfully attacked the capital at Zhaoge, killing the Duke and nearly destroying the state as well (660 BCE). It was only with the aid of Duke Huan of Qi that the state was eventually restored, with its capital moved to Chuqiu.

In 632 BCE Wey was once conquered by Duke Wen of Jin, because when Duke Wen (called Chong'er then) exiled to Wey, Duke Wen of Wey hadn't treated him well, and Duke Cheng of Wey (son of Duke Wen of Wey) was nearly poisoned by Duke Wen of Jin, but eventually the state was restored. (Before the Battle of Chengpu, when Chu was attacking Song, Jin attacked Wey and Cao as a diversion.)

In 492 BCE Duke Chu of Wey succeeded the throne from his grandfather Duke Ling, while his father Kuaikui, who was the heir of Duke Ling, had been deposed and exiled. To get the throne, Kuaikui fought against his own son and managed to exile Duke Chu in 481 BCE, and was titled as Duke Zhuang II, but was killed three years later. Duke Chu was restored in 475 BCE. The conflict between father and son weakened Wey, and Wey soon became attached to House of Zhao of Jin.

Downfall and end
In 346 BCE the duke of Wey degraded himself to a marquis. In 320 BCE the marquis of Wey again degraded himself to only a jun (lord). By then Wey only possessed a single county called Puyang. In 254 BCE King Anxi of Wei killed Lord Huai of Wey, but two years later he declared his son-in-law, who was from the house of Wey, to be lord of Wey, so Wey became a dependency of the Wei Kingdom. In 239 BCE the state of Qin occupied Puyang, and Wey migrated to Yewang in order to preserve its existence.

The state was so weak that it was presumably ignored by Qin Shihuang, and was only abolished in 209 BCE when Qin Er Shi deposed Jiao, Lord of Wey, two years before the collapse of the Qin Dynasty.

Vassals

Vassals of Wey include Shi clan, Ning clan, Kong clan, Beigong clan, Nan clan and Sun clan. They were mostly cadet branches of Wey. Kong clan, which came from the state of Nan Yan, was an exception.

List of rulers

Notes

References

 
Ancient Chinese states
209 BC
3rd-century BC disestablishments
States and territories disestablished in the 3rd century BC
1st-millennium BC disestablishments in China
States and territories established in the 11th century BC